L'invasione degli Omini Verdi is an Italian punk rock band, formed in July 1999 in the province of Brescia, Lombardy. They are associated with bands like Derozer, Punkreas, Porno Riviste, Shandon and Cattive Abitudini, which play a leading role in the Italian punk rock scene.

History
The band was formed in 1999, between Mantua and Brescia. The group was made up of Maurizio (drums), Alessandro (singer), Patrick (bass) and Peco & Fano (guitars). Soon Fano left the band, and Ale started playing the guitar. The first official album, Veniamo in pace, was released in 2001.

Peco left the group during a concert tour in 2002, but they found a new guitarist, Gio, who let Ale leave the guitar and devote himself entirely to singing. The lineup has not changed since then.

Lineup
 Ale – singer
 Gio – guitarist
 Giaco – bassist
 Mauri – drummer

Discography

Albums
Demo Autoprodotto (self-produced demo) 2000
Veniamo in Pace (We come in peace) 2001
Non è un Gioco (It's not a game) 2003
Contro (Against) 2005
Mondo a parte (World Apart) 2007
Nel nome di chi? (In the name of who?) 2010
 Il banco piange (The kitty is short) 2013

Available videos
Rottami live @ Boulevard

External links
Official website
Official MySpace

Italian musical groups
Italian punk rock groups